USS Barbel (SS-316), a Balao-class submarine, was the first ship of the United States Navy to be named for the barbel, a fish commonly called a minnow or carp.

Construction and commissioning
Barbel′s keel was laid down by the Electric Boat Company of Groton, Connecticut.  She was launched on 14 November 1943 sponsored by Mrs. Harold A. Allen, and commissioned 3 April 1944.

Service history
Barbel arrived at Pearl Harbor on 21 June 1944 and commenced preparation for her first war patrol. From 15 July 1944 – 4 February 1945, she carried out four war patrols and is officially credited with sinking six Japanese ships totaling 15,263 tons.

Barbel departed Fremantle submarine base, Western Australia, on 5 January 1945 for the South China Sea on her fourth patrol. On 3 February, Barbel sent a message reporting that she had been attacked three times by enemy aircraft dropping depth charges and would transmit further information on the following night.

Barbel was never heard from again. Japanese aviators reported an attack on a submarine off southwest Palawan on 4 February. Two bombs were dropped and one landed on the submarine near the bridge. The sub plunged, under a cloud of fire and spray. This was very likely the last engagement of Barbel. She was officially reported lost on 16 February 1945.

Awards
  Asiatic-Pacific Campaign Medal with three battle stars for World War II service

Memorials
Barbel has a war memorial in the Oregon Trail Veterans Cemetery in Casper, Wyoming.

References

External links
On Eternal Patrol: USS Barbel
Kill record: USS Barbel
 USS Barbel Memorial

Balao-class submarines
World War II submarines of the United States
Lost submarines of the United States
World War II shipwrecks in the South China Sea
Shipwrecks of the Philippines
Ships built in Groton, Connecticut
1943 ships
Maritime incidents in February 1945
Submarines sunk by aircraft
Ships sunk by Japanese aircraft